Piskutino is a rural locality (a village) in Rozhdestvenskoye Rural Settlement, Sobinsky District, Vladimir Oblast, Russia. The population was 4 as of 2010.

Geography 
Piskutino is located on the Yeza River, 45 km north of Sobinka (the district's administrative centre) by road. Stopino is the nearest rural locality.

References 

Rural localities in Sobinsky District